The following is a comprehensive list of releases from British pop and electronic music record label PC Music.

Releases 

Notes

All releases are available on streaming services, except the following with these notations:

  signifies a SoundCloud exclusive release
  signifies a YouTube exclusive release
  signifies a Bandcamp exclusive release

References

External links 
 PC Music catalogue

Discographies of British record labels
PC Music albums